Ancylosis magnifica is a species of snout moth in the genus Ancylosis. It was described by Arthur Gardiner Butler in 1875. It is found in South Africa.

References

Endemic moths of South Africa
Moths described in 1875
magnifica
Moths of Africa